The Samsung Impact (SGH-T746) / Samsung Highlight (SGH-T749)  is a 3G-capable phone manufactured by Samsung. The phone is touchscreen-only, and comes with a microSD slot under the battery cover, like the T-Mobile Tap. It comes in two colors, fire (red/orange) and ice (black/blue).

Software Version (T749): T749UVIK1.

Accessories supplied in the box
 1200 mAh Battery
 4.75V S20-Pin Charger
 S20-Pin Headset
 S20-Pin to USB 2.0 Data Cable
 User Guide & Manuals (2009)
back for phone

See Also
Samsung Solstice

References 

Samsung mobile phones
Mobile phones introduced in 2009